Harpalus chalcopterus is a species of ground beetle in the subfamily Harpalinae. It was described by Jeannel in 1948.

References

chalcopterus
Beetles described in 1948